Lophocryptis is a genus of moths of the family Noctuidae. The genus was erected by George Hampson in 1914.

Species
Lophocryptis argyrophora Hampson, 1914 Sierra Leone, Ghana, Nigeria, Cameroon
Lophocryptis sulphurea Hacker, Fiebig & Stadie, 2019 Uganda

References

External links

Acontiinae